Dumitru Grumezescu (born 7 March 1949) is a Romanian rower. He competed at the 1972 Summer Olympics and the 1976 Summer Olympics.

References

1949 births
Living people
Romanian male rowers
Olympic rowers of Romania
Rowers at the 1972 Summer Olympics
Rowers at the 1976 Summer Olympics